Galeotto Roberto Malatesta (1411–1432) was an Italian condottiero.

He was the son of Pandolfo III Malatesta and succeeded him in the lordship of Rimini in contrast with the local bishop; after the people rose against the latter, he obtained by Pope Martin V that his father's lands were entrusted to him and his brothers Domenico and Sigismondo.

Later, he had to face a rebellion spurred by Giovanni V Malatesta, but the people helped him in confirming his territories. Galeotto Roberto also thwarted the aims on Cesena of the Malatesta branch of Pesaro.

In 1427, aged 16, he married Margherita d'Este, one of the illegitimate daughters of Niccolò III, Lord of Ferrara. His wife survived him by more than 40 years, but she never married again and wanted to be buried by his side.

In 1432 he was given the command of 200 knights by Pope Eugene IV, but he died the same year at Sant'Arcangelo, at the age of 20.

Sources

1411 births
1432 deaths
Galeotto Roberto
15th-century condottieri
Lords of Rimini